Renato Petronio (5 February 1891 – 9 April 1976) was an Italian rowing coxswain who competed in the 1928 Summer Olympics and in the 1936 Summer Olympics.

In 1928 he won the gold medal as cox of the Italian boat in the coxed four event. Eight years later he was the coxswain of the Italian boat which was eliminated in the repechage of the coxed four competition.

References

External links
 profile

1891 births
1976 deaths
People from Piran
Italian male rowers
Coxswains (rowing)
Olympic rowers of Italy
Rowers at the 1928 Summer Olympics
Rowers at the 1936 Summer Olympics
Olympic gold medalists for Italy
Olympic medalists in rowing
Medalists at the 1928 Summer Olympics
European Rowing Championships medalists